Norway competed at the 2019 World Aquatics Championships in Gwangju, South Korea from 12 to 28 July.

Medalists

Diving

Norway's diving team consisted of 2 athletes (2 female).

Women

Swimming

Norway entered four swimmers.

Men

Women

References

Nations at the 2019 World Aquatics Championships
Norway at the World Aquatics Championships
2019 in Norwegian sport